Sternotomis caillaudi is a species of beetle in the family Cerambycidae. It was described by Chevrolat in 1844.

References

Sternotomini
Beetles described in 1844